Thomas & Friends is a children's television series about the engines and other characters working on the railways of the Island of Sodor, and is based on The Railway Series books written by the Reverend W. Awdry.

This article lists and details episodes from the twelfth series of the show, which was first broadcast from 1 September to 26 September 2008, making it the second season to be aired in less than a month. This series was originally planned to be narrated by Pierce Brosnan, replacing Michael Angelis and Michael Brandon for the UK and US narrations, respectively, starting with The Great Discovery. However, Brosnan withdrew from the series for unknown reasons, and the series was released with Angelis narrating the UK releases and Brandon narrating the US releases, as with prior series.  

Most episodes in this series have two titles: the titles from the UK broadcasts are shown on top, while the American-adapted titles are shown underneath.

This was the only season to feature the mixing of live-action and animation; by the following year, the series had transitioned to full CGI.

This was also the last season to utilize the live-action model animation of the show before switching over to full CGI in 2009, starting with Hero of the Rails. 

This was also the last series to utilize the Island of Sodor intro from the start of the UK broadcasts. Starting from Season 13-18, the CGI version of the Sodor Island intro is used at the start of the US broadcasts.

Production

Filming and animation
Series 12 marked the beginning of the show's transition into CGI (computer-generated imagery). Characters' faces were animated through CGI with the aid of motion capture animation. The physical models' molded faces were replaced by white targets with triangles to fix a computer-animated face in post-production. Static models of people and animals were replaced with 3D animations by using small, metal sticks with coloured points on each end. The animation was provided by Nitrogen Studios, the studio contracted for future full-CGI episodes. This change marked the movement of production of the show from the United Kingdom to Canada, although the model scenes were still filmed at Shepperton Studios. 

This was the last series where Ed Welch provided the music, while Robert Hartshorne continued to compose the music afterwards until he was replaced by Chris Renshaw for Thomas & Friends in 4-D: Bubbling Boilers.

HiT Entertainment's Senior Vice-president of Production and Programming, Christopher Skala, stated that the change, aside from budgetary reasons, was intended to convey more emotion and flexibility through the stories. Skala claimed that, of his focus group, even those who felt that Thomas, as an institution, should not be changed in this way, ultimately responded positively to the demonstration of the new animation techniques.

Episodes

Characters

Introduced
 Hank ("Heave Ho Thomas!")
 Flora ("Tram Trouble")
 Colin ("The Party Surprise")

Recurring cast

 Thomas
 Edward
 Henry
 Gordon
 James
 Percy
 Toby
 Emily
 Duck
 Donald and Douglas
 Oliver
 Ben
 Diesel
 Mavis
 Salty
 Murdoch
 Neville
 Rosie
 Whiff
 Stanley
 Skarloey
 Rheneas
 Sir Handel
 Peter Sam
 Rusty
 Duncan
 Freddie
 Troublesome Trucks
 Toad
 Hector
 Bertie
 Harold
 Jack
 The Fat Controller
 Lady Hatt
 Mr. Percival
 Mighty Mac (Mighty speaks, but Mac does not)
 Stepney (does not speak in UK dub)
 'Arry and Bert (do not speak)
 Harvey (does not speak)
 Arthur (does not speak)
 Annie and Clarabel (do not speak)
 Henrietta (does not speak)
 Rocky (does not speak)
 Trevor (does not speak)
 Cranky (does not speak)
 Alfie (does not speak)
 Jeremy (does not speak)
 Dowager Hatt (does not speak)
 Jenny Packard (does not speak)
 Farmer McColl (does not speak)
 Sodor Brass Band (do not speak)
 Bulgy (cameo)
 Max (cameo)
 Farmer Trotter (cameo)
 Cyril (cameo)
 Proteus (mentioned; seen as a statue)

References

2008 British television seasons
Thomas & Friends seasons